Denis Crossan, B.S.C. is a  cinematographer. He attended the National Film and Television School in Beaconsfield. 

Crossan started his career shooting numerous Music Videos and commercials and through the years has worked with major directors and advertising agencies, resulting in a number of awards for cinematography, including Clio Awards, Creative Circle Awards and D&AD.

In 1993 he was asked to join The British Society of Cinematographers (B.S.C.). His movie credits include I Know What You Did Last Summer, directed by Jim Gillespie, starring Sarah Michelle Gellar and Ryan Phillippe; Clandestine Marriage, directed by Christopher Miles, starring Nigel Hawthorne and Timothy Spall, which won Best Cinematography Newport Beach Film Festival California 2000; The Hole, directed by Nick Hamm, starring Thora Birch and Keira Knightley; Me Without You, directed by Sandra Goldbacher, starring Michelle Williams, Anna Friel and Kyle MacLachlan; Agent Cody Banks, directed by Harald Zwart, starring Frankie Muniz and Hilary Duff; Pink Panther 2, starring Steve Martin, Andy García, Jean Reno, John Cleese, Alfred Molina and Emily Mortimer.'Take Down' directed by Jim Gillespie, Urban Hymn and 'Asher' directed by Michael Caton-Jones starring Ron Perlman and Richard Dreyfus, television episodes 'The Bastard Executioner' for Fox and 'Outlander' for Sony. His latest work includes, the feature films 'Our Ladies' for Sony and 'Prey for the Devil for Lionsgate.

References

External links

Living people
Year of birth missing (living people)
Scottish cinematographers
Film people from Glasgow
Alumni of the National Film and Television School